Chuck Adams (born April 23, 1971) is a former professional tennis player from the United States. He won one ATP singles title and achieved a career-high singles ranking of World No. 34 in 1995.

ATP career finals

Singles: 4 (1 title, 3 runners-up)

ATP Challenger and ITF Futures finals

Singles: 6 (4–2)

Performance timelines

Singles

External links
 
 

1971 births
Living people
American male tennis players
People from Pacific Palisades, California
Tennis people from California